Pin Oak Community is an unincorporated community in Warren County, in the U.S. state of Missouri.

History
A post office called Pin Oak was established in 1854, and remained in operation until 1876. The community was named for a grove of pin oak trees near the original town site.

References

Unincorporated communities in Warren County, Missouri
Unincorporated communities in Missouri